The Scottish football champions are the winners of the highest league in Scottish football, namely the Scottish Football League (SFL) from 1890 until 1998, the Scottish Premier League (SPL) from 1998 until 2013 and the Scottish Premiership thereafter.

The SFL was established in 1890, initially as an amateur league until professionalism in Scottish football was  legalised in 1893. At the end of the first season Dumbarton and Rangers finished level on points at the top of the table. The rules in force at the time required that the teams contest a play-off match for the championship, which finished in a 2–2 draw, and the first ever championship was thus shared between two clubs, the only occasion on which this has happened. In 1893 a lower division was formed, with the existing division renamed Division One. The higher tier continued during World War I but the league was suspended altogether during World War II.  Although there were several short spells when a third level was created, the two-division structure remained largely in place until 1975, when a major re-organisation of the league led to a new three-tier setup and the creation of a new Premier Division at the highest level. In 1998, the teams then in the Premier Division broke away to form the SPL, which supplanted the Premier Division as the highest level of football in Scotland. The SPL and SFL merged in 2013 to form the Scottish Professional Football League (SPFL), which branded its top division as the Scottish Premiership.

Throughout its existence the championship of Scottish football has been dominated by two Glasgow clubs, Celtic and Rangers. The two rivals, who are collectively known as the "Old Firm", have claimed the vast majority of league titles. As of 2022, Rangers have won 55 and Celtic 52, while no other club has won the title on more than four occasions. No club outside the Old Firm has won the title since the 1984–85 season, when the Aberdeen side managed by Alex Ferguson won the Premier Division. The current 37-year period of dominance by the Old Firm is a record; the previous longest streak was 27 years, between 1904 and 1931.  Each of the Old Firm clubs has managed a run of nine consecutive championships: Celtic from 1966 to 1974 and again from 2012 to 2020, and Rangers from 1989 to 1997. Each of the two clubs has also claimed the double, by winning the league and the Scottish Cup in the same season, on many occasions. As of the end of the 2021–22 season, Celtic have won 19 doubles and Rangers 18. Only Linfield in Northern Ireland (24) and South China in Hong Kong (20) have won more doubles. The only other club to have won a league and Scottish Cup double is Aberdeen, in 1983–84.  Additionally, both old Firm clubs have completed a treble seven times by also winning the Scottish League Cup.  In the 1966–67 season, Celtic took all three domestic trophies, and also won the European Cup to complete the only quadruple to date.

Champions

Key:

Scottish Football League (1890–1893)

Scottish Football League Division One (1893–1946)

Scottish Football League Division 'A' (1946–1955)

Scottish Football League Division One (1955–1975)

Scottish Football League Premier Division (1975–1998)

Scottish Premier League (1998–2013)

Scottish Premiership (2013–present)

Total titles won

Clubs participating in the 2022–23 Scottish Premiership are denoted in bold type.
Clubs no longer active are denoted in italics.

By city/town

 Teams in Italics are defunct, and cannot win any more championships
 Teams in Bold currently participate in the Scottish Premiership

See also
 List of Scottish Cup finals
 List of Scottish League Cup finals

Notes

References

Scotland
champions
Champions
Champions
Champions
Champions
Scottish football